Alfred Nicdao is a Filipino-Australian actor, known for his roles in the Australian soap opera Neighbours and Tomorrow When the War Began. He is the father of Charlotte Nicdao.

References

External links
 

Living people
Year of birth missing (living people)
Australian male soap opera actors
Male actors of Filipino descent
Australian people of Filipino descent